Adrian S. Cristobal Jr is a Filipino attorney, politician administrator. He served under the Department of Trade and Industry as interim secretary from December 2015 to June 2016 under President Benigno Aquino III. He joined the administration in 2010, replacing Gregory Domingo.

Early life 
He earned a doctor of Law at the Ateneo de Manila University and a BA degree in political science from the University of California Berkeley.

Career 
Cristobal held the role of special assistant to the Secretary of the Department of the Interior and Local Government in 1994, and also served different government agencies as an adviser to the head.

Cristobal had a law practice, and taught in the Ateneo School of Government.

In 2001, he served as Undersecretary for Consumer Welfare and Trade Regulation. He held the position as Supervisor of Undersecretary for Legal Affairs before he was appointed Chief of Staff of the Secretary to the Department of Trade and Industry until 2005. He served as Director-General of the Intellectual Property Office from 2005-2009. From 2010-2012 he served as  Undersecretary for International Trade.

In 2012 he became Undersecretary for Industry Development and Trade Policy, and held the position of Deputy Chairman and Head of Board of Investments.

References 

Living people
20th-century Filipino lawyers
Secretaries of Trade and Industry of the Philippines
Benigno Aquino III administration cabinet members
Year of birth missing (living people)